The American brindle (Lithomoia germana) is a moth of the family Noctuidae. It is found from Alaska to Newfoundland south to Pennsylvania, Colorado and Oregon.

The wingspan is about 40 mm. The forewings are light gray and streaked and shaded with shades of gray and brown. The hindwings are gray-beige and shaded darker towards the outer margin. At rest, adults mostly roll their wings around their body and thus take on the appearance of a small twig. Adults are on wing from mid-April to early May and again from mid-August to the beginning of October.

The larvae feed on various trees and woody shrubs of the families Salicaceae and Betulaceae. Adults feed on nectar of goldenrod flowers.

It hibernates as an adult.

Subspecies
Lithomoia germana germana
Lithomoia germana morrisoni Barnes & Benjamin, 1922 (Alaska)
Lithomoia germana albertae McDunnough, 1938 (Alberta)

External links
Images
Butterflies and moths of the Yukon

Cuculliinae
Moths of North America